Ice Tower Ridge is a ridge at about  that descends the southwestern slope of the summit crater of Mount Erebus on Ross Island, Antarctica. It is so named because the ridge is defined by a series of fumarolic ice towers.

References

Ridges of Ross Island